Staņislavs Pihockis (born 9 August 1988) is a Latvian football defender. He is a right wingback, currently playing for Hammerfest FK in the Norwegian 3. divisjon.

Career
Pihockis started his career in FK Riga. With the team he played in a matches of Intertoto Cup 2008 against Elfsborg. In December 2008 he was invited by Bulgarian side Cherno More Varna to join trial period. On 10 January 2009 Stanislavs signed for three years with Cherno More, but only appeared in one Bulgarian A PFG match. In Summer 2009, he became a free agent and then he joined Latvian 1.division team FS Metta-Latvijas Universitāte. Before the start of the 2010–2011 season he signed for the ambitious Latvian team FB Gulbene-2005. In 2011, he left Gulbene, signing for FK Kruoja Pakruojis in Lithuanian A Lyga. In 2012 Pihockis returned to Latvia, signing a contract with the Latvian Higher League club FC Jūrmala. He played in Jūrmala for one season, making 29 league appearances. Before the start of the 2013 season Pihockis returned to his former club FB Gulbene, playing in the Latvian First League. Having played 15 matches and scored 3 goals, Pihockis made a move to Norway in September 2013 joining the 3. divisjon club Hammerfest FK.

References

External links

1988 births
Footballers from Riga
Living people
Latvian footballers
FK Rīga players
FK Ventspils players
Latvian expatriate footballers
Expatriate footballers in Bulgaria
First Professional Football League (Bulgaria) players
PFC Cherno More Varna players
Expatriate footballers in Lithuania
Latvian expatriate sportspeople in Lithuania
FS METTA/Latvijas Universitāte players
FC Jūrmala players
FB Gulbene players
Expatriate footballers in Norway
Association football defenders